The Men's 3m Springboard event was contested for the sixth time at the World Aquatics Championships during the 1991 edition, held in Perth, Western Australia.

The competition was split into two phases: with a preliminary round, where the twelve divers with the highest scores advanced to the final. In the last round the remaining divers performed a set of dives to determine the final ranking. There were a total number of 33 competitors.

Final

Non-Qualifiers

See also
Diving at the 1988 Summer Olympics
Diving at the 1992 Summer Olympics

References
 2003 World Championships Team USA Media Guide

Diving at the 1991 World Aquatics Championships